Roydon George McKillop (1881 – 29 December 1951) was an Australian politician.

He was born in Orange to grazier George Duncan McKillop. He was a grazier at Narromine, and pioneered citrus growing in the area. In 1913, he married Violet Crago, with whom he had five children. On 7 December 1932 he was appointed to the New South Wales Legislative Council as a Country Party member, but he did not take his seat. He died at Narromine in 1951.

References

1881 births
1951 deaths
National Party of Australia members of the Parliament of New South Wales
Members of the New South Wales Legislative Council
20th-century Australian politicians